Candida Cave is a practising painter, playwright and art historian.  In 1978 she and artist Nicholas Cochrane founded Hampstead Hampstead Fine Arts College, an independent sixth form college specialising in the study of Arts and Humanities, where she is Principal.

Candida studied painting at The Ruskin School of Fine Art & Drawing, Oxford. She paints in oil and tempera and her current work is inspired by medieval miniatures, illuminated manuscripts and Gothic stained glass. Her work has been exhibited at the Mall Galleries, London and the Limetree Kitchen and in the ARTWAVE Visual Arts Festival.

Her plays include Still Lives, Savonarola, Bonfires and Vanities and Lotte's Journey.  Her most recent play on the Mitford sisters had a rehearsed reading at the Lyric Studio, Hammersmith. Cave’s plays are often set in an historical context and have been performed at the Royal Academy of Arts, the British Museum, Tate Britain, the National Portrait Gallery, London theatres and for the British Council in Florence, Bologna and Rome.

References
Review for Lotte’s Journey, the Times
Art Exhibition at LimeTree Kitchen
From ArtWave 2014

Year of birth missing (living people)
Living people
British dramatists and playwrights